Sampsoniyevskoye is a municipal okrug occupying the southern part of Vyborgsky District of the federal city of Saint Petersburg, Russia.

Since the 18th century until virtually the 21st century it was a primary industrial area of the city, built up with factories and apartment buildings for their workforce, while in post-Soviet times a number of industrial plants have been closed down or relocated and their premises and / or land redeveloped. Large grounds in the southwest from the Neva embankment Inland have long been used by the campus of the Military Medical Academy, and northwards there are two other specialized learning facilities - the campuses of Military Institute of Physical Culture and of Saint Petersburg State Pediatric Medical University. Beyond the northern boundarynd of the municipality since the early 19th century in the grounds of the former Alexander Davidson's English Farm has been working Russia's higher school of forestry, now Saint Petersburg Forestry Technical University, whose buildings are scattered around a large botanical garden park. To its south, within the okrug, over a block of streets there are buildings of dormitories for students mostly of Saint Petersburg Polytechnic University. The area is washed from the south by the Neva River, and from the west by its arm the Great Nevka River.

Location and history
The district and okrug inventory and boundaries were defined by the Act of Saint Petersburg on Territorial Division of Saint Petersburg of 2005 (subsequently updated):

 
Together with the whole district, the okrug is centered around the southern part of the old road from Saint Petersburg to Vyborg, a borderline city that was founded by Sweden, but was taken by the Russian Army for the first time during the Great Northern War fought in the first quarter of the 18th century. That war has been commemorated in the okrug land: the decisive Russian victory in the Battle of Poltava falling on the feast day of Saint Sampson the Hospitable, St Sampson's church and later the present cathedral were built, and several streets were given the Swedish names of cities and towns in Finland. The southern part of the thoroughfare was named Bolshoy Sampsoniyevskiy prospect (the Greater Avenue of [Saint] Sampson), and when in post-Soviet times municipal okrugs were laid out within pre-existing city districts, this okrug was given Sampson's name as well. The okrug's arms show his namesake - an Old Testament hero Samson, whose figure shown tearing open the mouth of the lion that attacked him was in the 18th century used as a rhetorical symbol of Russian victory over the Swedish empire epitomised in the his golden statue in the center of Peterhof palace fountain park. A new connection with Sweden was established by the entrepreneurial family of Nobel in the second half of the 19th century, who built a factory and living quarters in the territory. Apartment buildings for families of local factories' workforce were often erected in late 1920s and first half of 1930s in Constructivism style.

Landmarks

Military Medical Academy

St Sampson the Hospitable's Cathedral and churchyard garden

Ludwig Nobel factory residential complex

Vyborgskaya Embankment and industrial architecture

Pediatric University

Monument and memorial plaque to Professor Alexander Tur

Soviet times

Secondary school number 104
School bears the name of a Soviet World War II hero officer Mikhail Kharchenko and stands along the street of his name, with entrance facing the corner of Kantemirovskaya Street.

House of Specialists

Former building of Pulp and Paper Industry College and later of Design Bureau for Special Machine-Building
The building with its front garden. Designed for the college, occupied almost until 2020s by machine-builders.

SKA - VIFK Swimming pool
Built in early 1960s, the reinforced concrete 50-m long swimming pool was the city's largest in 1960s and 1970s. Open to the general public, it was subordinate to Leningrad Military District, then Army Sports Club (Russ. abbr. SKA), and later to Saint Petersburg Military Institute of Physical Education (Russ. abbr. VIFK), whose territory it adjoins.

References 

Vyborgskiy District of Saint Petersburg